Sakalauskas, Sakalauskienė, Sakalauskaitė is  a Lithuanian family name. 

The surname may refer to:

Rimantas Sakalauskas, sculptor
Rytis Sakalauskas, sprinter
Šarūnas Sakalauskas, basketball coach
Vaidas Sakalauskas, chess master
Vytautas Sakalauskas, prime minister of Lithuania (18 November 1985 - 17 March 1990)

Lithuanian-language surnames